Kabardino-Balkaria (presented at the 2013 and 2014 contests as Kabardino-Balkaria and Karachay-Cherkessia) were one of the twenty-four participating countries and regions competing in the first Turkvision Song Contest. Despite being two separate republics, they sent a joint competitor in 2013, to represent the both of them.

History
Kabardino-Balkaria made their debut in the Turkvision Song Contest at the  festival, in Eskişehir, Turkey. Kabardino-Balkaria selected their participant on 1 December 2013, a national selection was held in the Karachay-Cherkessia Capital Cherkessk at the Avenue Restaurant, a total of 12 artists competed, the winner was Eldar Zhanikaev with "Adamdı bizni atıbız" (Имя тебе-человек). The contest in 2013 was broadcast on channel 9 The Wave as Elbrusoid the organiser of the nations participation is not a television station.

On 22 July 2014, Kabardino-Balkaria confirmed their participation in the 2014 contest. It was announced that an open national selection would be held, songs would be submitted to the Ministry of Culture of Kabardino-Balkaria and Karachay-Cherkessia, with the songs going on to perform in a selection in Cherkessk. It was announced that online voting would help select the winner, however, due to low submissions this did not occur. The final took place on 28 September 2014, 10 artists competed, Eldar Zhanikaev was selected with the song "Barama" (Барама).

Participation overview

See also 
 Russia in the Turkvision Song Contest

References 

Turkvision
Countries in the Turkvision Song Contest